David J. States M.D., Ph.D. is a Professor of Human Genetics at the University of Michigan.  His research group is using computational methods to understand the human genome and how it relates to the human proteome.  He is the Director of the Michigan NIH Bioinformatics Training Program and a Senior Scientist in the National Center for Integrative Biomedical Informatics.

Early life and education
States earned his B.A. ('75), M.D. ('83) and Ph.D. ('83) degrees at Harvard University.

Career
He was a Staff Scientist at the National Magnet Laboratory at MIT and a resident in internal medicine at UCSD Medical Center.  He then moved to the NIH as a Clinical Associate and Senior Staff Fellow where he joined the National Center for Biotechnology Information (NCBI).  While at NCBI, he and Warren Gish enhanced BLAST, one of the most widely used programs in bioinformatics [4].  In 1992, States was recruited to Washington University as Director of the Institute for Biomedical Computing, and in 2001, he moved to the University of Michigan to establish the University of Michigan Bioinformatics Program.  He was a member of the founding Board of Directors and Treasurer of the International Society for Computational Biology and Chair of the 1996 and 2005 Intelligent Systems for Molecular Biology Conferences.

States is also known for his work in nuclear magnetic resonance where he developed pure absorption phase multi-dimensional spectroscopy, a technique now widely used in protein structure determination.  States also contributed to computational biophysics as an author of the CHARMM molecular dynamics simulation program.  He combined NMR spectroscopy and modeling to demonstrate for the first time the presence of native-like structure in the folding intermediates of bovine pancreatic trypsin inhibitor[1-2] and the first demonstration of a conformationally trapped folding intermediate [3].

References 
 States DJ, Creighton TE, Dobson CM, Karplus M. Conformations of intermediates in the folding of the pancreatic trypsin inhibitor. Journal of Molecular Biology. 1987 195(3):731-9. 
 States DJ, Dobson CM, Karplus M. A new two-disulphide intermediate in the refolding of reduced bovine pancreatic trypsin inhibitor. Journal of Molecular Biology. 1984 174(2):411-8. 
 States DJ, Dobson CM, Karplus M, Creighton TE. A conformational isomer of bovine pancreatic trypsin inhibitor protein produced by refolding. Nature. 1980 286(5773):630-2. 
 Gish W, States DJ. Identification of protein coding regions by database similarity search. Nature Genetics. 1993 3(3):266-72.

External links
 States lab
 National Center for Integrative Biomedical Informatics
 Michigan Bioinformatics Program

American biophysicists
American bioinformaticians
Harvard Medical School alumni
Living people
Proteomics
University of Michigan faculty
Year of birth missing (living people)